Little Harbour may refer to:

 Little Harbour, Nova Scotia (disambiguation), several places
 Little Harbour, Newfoundland and Labrador, a drive-through community of about 15 families in Newfoundland and Labrador, Canada.
 Little Harbour (Gander Lake), Gander, Newfoundland and Labrador, Canada
 Little Harbour (Woody Point), Newfoundland and Labrador, Canada
 Little Harbour, Abaco, Bahamas